Nicolas Stewart was a Scottish footballer who played in Scotland and the American Soccer League.

Stewart played for several teams in the Scottish Junior Football League including Shettleston Juniors, Maryhill Hibs F.C. and Kirkintilloch Rob Roy F.C.  In 1926, he signed with the Springfield Babes of the American Soccer League. The Babes withdrew from the league just after Christmas 1926 and Stewart moved to the New Bedford Whalers for the rest of the season. In 1927, Stewart joined the Hartford Americans. Like the Babes, the Americans withdrew from the league early in the season and Stewart again moved to the Whalers. He remained with the Whalers except for loans to Brooklyn Wanderers and Newark Skeeters. In July 1930, he returned to Scotland where he joined Alloa Athletic

External links

References

Alloa Athletic F.C. players
American Soccer League (1921–1933) players
Brooklyn Wanderers players
Hartford Americans players
Kirkintilloch Rob Roy F.C. players
New Bedford Whalers players
Newark Skeeters players
Scottish footballers
Scottish expatriate footballers
Springfield Babes players
Association footballers not categorized by position
Scottish expatriate sportspeople in the United States
Expatriate soccer players in the United States
Year of birth missing